The  was the sixth season of the nationwide fourth tier of  Japanese football, and the 21st season since the establishment of Japan Football League.

Starting from this season, the league reverted to a one-stage double round-robin again.

2019 season Clubs
Sixteen clubs will feature in this season of Japan Football League. There were some changes: Vanraure Hachinohe won promotion to pro football in 2018, while Cobaltore Onagawa was relegated. There are two new clubs in the JFL, debuting in this category: Matsue City won the Regional Promotion Series, while Suzuka Unlimited came second in the final phase.

Personnel and kits

League table

Top scorers
.

Promotion from Regional Leagues
Iwaki FC and Kochi United SC won the promotion after coming in the Top 2 of the Final Round of the 2019 Regional Promotion Series.

Attendances

Notes

References

External links
Official Site (in Japanese)

Japan Football League seasons
3